Zhguchy was the second ship of the  of the Soviet Navy.

History
The ship was built at Zhdanov Shipyard in Leningrad and was launched on 14 October 1959 and commissioned into the Northern Fleet on 23 December 1960.

In 1965 and 1966, she won the prize of the Commander-in-Chief of the Navy for missile training (as part of the KUG). On 19 May, she was reclassified as a large rocket ship (BRK).

From February 6, 1967, to January 10, 1969, she was modernized and rebuilt according to Project 57-A at the Leningrad shipyard named after V.I. A. A. Zhdanova. On 21 October 1969, she was reclassified into a large anti-submarine ship (BOD).

From January 1 to December 31, 1970, while carrying out combat service in the war zone in the Mediterranean Sea, she provided assistance to the armed forces of Egypt. From September 10 to September 15, 1971, she paid a visit to Oslo. In the period from 21 to 26 September 1971, the ship visited Rotterdam (Netherlands). From 12 to 17 May 1975, she visited Boston and Cuba, from 24 to 29 May 1977, she visited Cherbourg, from 10 to 15 October of the same year, she visited Oslo again. From May 1980 to January 1981, she served in the Atlantic Ocean, thereby setting a record for the longest voyage among Soviet warships. She visited the ports of Angola, Guinea, and Benin. She protected Soviet and Cuban fishermen in the Western Sahara region.

On 30 July 1987, the destroyer was retired from the USSR Navy in connection with the delivery to the OFI for disarmament, dismantling and sale. On August 6, her crew was disbanded.

In December 1988, she was sold to a private Spanish firm in Spain.

References

In Russian

External links

 
 
Gallery of the ship. Navsource. Retrieved 11 August 2021

Ships built at Severnaya Verf
Kanin-class destroyers
1959 ships
Cold War destroyers of the Soviet Union